The 2013–14 Liberty Flames basketball team represented Liberty University during the 2013–14 NCAA Division I men's basketball season. The Flames, led by fifth year head coach Dale Layer, played their home games at the Vines Center as members of the North Division of the Big South Conference. They finished the season 11–21, 5–11 in Big South play to finish in fifth place in the North Division. They lost in the first round of the Big South tournament to Winthrop.

Roster

Schedule and results
Source: 

|-
!colspan=9 style="background:#0A254E; color:#FFFFFF"| Non-conference games

|-
!colspan=9 style="background:#0A254E; color:#FFFFFF"| Conference games

 

|-
!colspan=9 style="background:#0A254E; color:#FFFFFF"| Big South tournament

See also
 2013–14 NCAA Division I men's basketball season	
 2013–14 NCAA Division I men's basketball rankings

References

Liberty Flames basketball seasons
Liberty
Liberty Flames bask
Liberty Flames bask